The Source is an American hip hop and entertainment website, and a magazine that publishes annually or . It is the world's longest-running rap periodical, being founded as a newsletter in 1988 by [David Mays].

In 1999 The Los Angeles Times reported that, based on data from Alliance for Audited Media, formerly known as Audit Bureau of Circulations (North America), the print edition of The Source was "the No. 1-selling music magazine on newsstands in America." By 2009, they were among those losing readership and advertising income.

History
The magazine's website began in 1998. At that point the monthly print magazine was celebrating its 100th issue.

Others who were involved as co-owners/editors include Raymond 'Ray Benzino' Leon Scott. Between 2005 and 2010 the magazine didn't award any of its '5 mic' awards.

The Sources Five-Mic albums
The Record Report is a section in the publication in which the magazine's staff rates hip-hop albums. Ratings range from one to five mics, paralleling a typical five-star rating scale. An album that is rated at four-and-a-half or five mics is considered by The Source to be a superior hip hop album. Over the first ten years or so, the heralded five-mic rating only applied to albums that were universally lauded hip hop albums. A total of 45 albums have been awarded five mics; a complete, chronological list is below.

Albums that originally received five mics:

People's Instinctive Travels and the Paths of Rhythm – A Tribe Called Quest
AmeriKKKa's Most Wanted – Ice Cube
Let the Rhythm Hit 'Em – Eric B. & Rakim
One for All – Brand Nubian
De La Soul Is Dead – De La Soul
The Low End Theory – A Tribe Called Quest
Illmatic – Nas
Life After Death – The Notorious B.I.G.
Aquemini – Outkast
The Blueprint – Jay-Z
Stillmatic – Nas
The Fix – Scarface
The Naked Truth – Lil' Kim
Trill OG – Bun B
My Beautiful Dark Twisted Fantasy – Kanye West

Albums that were not rated upon their releases, but were later rated five mics in 2002:

Run-D.M.C. – Run-D.M.C.
Radio – LL Cool J
Licensed to Ill – Beastie Boys
Raising Hell – Run-D.M.C.
Criminal Minded – Boogie Down Productions
Paid in Full – Eric B. & Rakim
By All Means Necessary – Boogie Down Productions
It Takes a Nation of Millions to Hold Us Back – Public Enemy
Long Live the Kane – Big Daddy Kane
Critical Beatdown – Ultramagnetic MCs
Straight Out the Jungle – Jungle Brothers
Strictly Business – EPMD
The Great Adventures of Slick Rick – Slick Rick
Straight Outta Compton – N.W.A
No One Can Do It Better – The D.O.C.
All Eyez on Me – 2Pac

Albums that originally received 4.5 mics, and were later re-rated to five:
Breaking Atoms – Main Source
Death Certificate – Ice Cube
The Chronic – Dr. Dre
Enter the Wu-Tang (36 Chambers) – Wu-Tang Clan
Ready to Die – The Notorious B.I.G.
The Infamous – Mobb Deep
Only Built 4 Cuban Linx... – Raekwon
2001 – Dr. Dre

Albums that originally received four mics, and were later re-rated to five:
Grip It! On That Other Level – Geto Boys
Doggystyle – Snoop Doggy Dogg
The Diary – Scarface
Me Against the World – 2Pac
The Score – The Fugees
Reasonable Doubt – Jay-Z

Music

Compilation album
The Source released a compilation album of hip-hop hits.

Albums

References

External links
* Jonathan Shecter aka Shecky Green – The Unkut Interview, Part 1, Jan. 2013

African-American magazines
Annual magazines published in the United States
Biannual magazines published in the United States
Black-owned companies of the United States
Cultural magazines published in the United States
Hip hop magazines
Magazines established in 1988
Magazines published in New York City
Music magazines published in the United States